Merila Zarei (also Romanized as "Merīlā Zāre'ī"; born April 14, 1974) is an Iranian actress. She is one of the most influential actresses after the Islamic Revolution of Iran, who has acted in the films of great directors such as Asghar Farhadi, Ebrahim Hatami Kia, Pouran Derakhshandeh, Reza Attaran, Abbas Kia Rostami and Masoud Kimiaei.

Biography 
A graduate of Azad University of Tehran, during her studies she became interested in acting through Ezatollah Entezami's acting courses.

Her first movie was Patak by Ali Asghar Shadravan in 1994. She received the Crystal Simorgh for the best actress in a supporting role for The Friday's Soldiers (2005, Masoud Kimiai), from the 23rd Fajr International Film Festival. She is also the winner of best actress of 32nd Fajr International Film Festival.

Filmography 

Movies:
 Patak by Ali Ashghar Shadervan (1994)
 Ruy-e Khat-e Marg directed by Shafi Aghamohammadian (1995)
 Zan-e Sharghi directed by Rambod Lotfi (1996)
 Khalaban directed by Jamal Shurjeh (1996)
 Do Zan (Two Women) directed by Tahmineh Milani (1999)
 Tekyeh bar bad directed by Dariush Farhang (1999)
 The Fifth Reaction (The 5th Reaction) directed by Tahmineh Milani (2001)
 Eshgh-e Film directed by Ebrahim Vahidzadeh (2001)
 Ham Nafas directed by Mehdi Fakhimzadeh (2002)
 Mo'ādeleh directed by Ebrahim Vahidzadeh (2002)
 Sizdah Gorbeh ruy-e Shirvani directed by Ali Abdolalizadeh (2002)
 Sarbazhaye jome (Friday's Soldiers) directed by Masoud Kimiayie (2002)
 Mojaradha directed by Asghar Hashemi (2003)
 The Unwanted Woman directed by Tahmineh Milani (2005)
 Zagros directed by Mohammad Ali Najafi (2004)
 Hokm (Verdict) directed by Masoud Kimiayie (2004)
 Pāpital (Hedera helix) directed by Ardeshir Shelileh (2005)
 Dasthaye khali directed by Abolqasem Talebi (2007)
 Invitation (Davat) directed by Ebrahim Hatamikia (2008)
 About Elly, directed by Asghar Farhadi (2009)
 Keyfar directed by Hassan Fathi
 Digari directed by Mehdi Rahmani
 Nader and Simin, A Separation, directed by Asghar Farhadi (2011)
 I Feel Sleepy directed by Reza Attaran (2012)
 Bear directed by Khosro Masumi
  Hush! Girls Don't Scream  directed by Pouran Derakhshandeh (2012)
  Golden Regime  directed by Reza Sobhani
  Everything for sale  directed by Amir Hossein Saghafi (2012)
  Che  directed by Ebrahim Hatamikia (2012)
  Track 143  directed by Narges Abyar (2013)
 The Little Black Fish directed by Majid Esmaeili (2015)
 Bodyguard Ebrahim Hatamikia (2016)
 Under the Smoky Roof (2017)
 Henas (2022)

TV series:
 The Sea People directed by Siroos Moghaddam
 ''Jeyran directed by Hassan Fathi

Awards 
 Won Crystal Simorgh Best Actress - 32nd Fajr International Film Festival (2014), 35th Fajr International Film Festival (2017)
 nominated Track 143 Best Actress -  8th Asia Pacific Screen Awards (2014)

Personal life
She has a younger sister, Melika Zarei, who is also an actress.

See also 
 Iranian women
 Iranian cinema
 List of famous Persian women
 List of Iranian actresses

References

External links

1974 births
Living people
People from Tehran
Actresses from Tehran
Iranian film actresses
Iranian television actresses
Islamic Azad University alumni
20th-century Iranian actresses
21st-century Iranian actresses
Crystal Simorgh for Best Actress winners
Crystal Simorgh for Best Supporting Actress winners